Georgy Robertovich Vasmund (Russian, Георгий Робертович Васмунд, 25 December 1840 - 30 May 1904) was an Imperial Russian division commander, lieutenant general. He took part in the suppression of the uprising in Poland and the war against the Ottoman Empire.

Awards
Order of Saint Stanislaus (House of Romanov), 3rd class, 1863
Order of Saint Anna, 3rd class, 1864
Order of Saint Vladimir, 4th class, 1872
Order of Saint Stanislaus (House of Romanov), 2nd class, 1876
Order of Saint George, 4th degree, 1877
Order of Saint Vladimir, 3rd class, 1878
Gold Sword for Bravery, 1878
Order of Saint Anna, 2nd class, 1879
Order of Saint Stanislaus (House of Romanov), 1st class, 1889
Order of Saint Anna, 1st class, 1892
Order of Saint Vladimir, 2nd class, 1894
Order of the White Eagle (Russian Empire), 1898
Order of Saint Alexander Nevsky, 1902

References

1840 births
1904 deaths
Russian people of the January Uprising
Russian military personnel of the Russo-Turkish War (1877–1878)
Recipients of the Order of Saint Stanislaus (Russian), 3rd class
Recipients of the Order of St. Anna, 3rd class
Recipients of the Order of St. Vladimir, 4th class
Recipients of the Order of Saint Stanislaus (Russian), 2nd class
Recipients of the Order of St. Vladimir, 3rd class
Recipients of the Gold Sword for Bravery
Recipients of the Order of St. Anna, 2nd class
Recipients of the Order of Saint Stanislaus (Russian), 1st class
Recipients of the Order of St. Anna, 1st class
Recipients of the Order of St. Vladimir, 2nd class
Recipients of the Order of the White Eagle (Russia)